N'Zi-N'Ziblékro is a village in eastern Ivory Coast. It is in the sub-prefecture of M'Bahiakro in M'Bahiakro Department, Iffou Region, Lacs District.

N'Zi-N'Ziblékro was a commune until March 2012, when it became one of 1126 communes nationwide that were abolished.

Notes

Former communes of Ivory Coast
Populated places in Lacs District
Populated places in Iffou